Sergio Guadarrama (born 1982)  is an Austin-based Mexican-American fashion designer. He is the founder of Celestino Couture, a Hudson-based fashion designing company.

Personal Life & Education 
Guadarrama was born in Austin, Texas and raised in Mexico. Later he moved to Cedar Park, Texas, and attended Cedar Park High School.  He was awarded his degree in fashion designing from Fashion Institute of Design & Merchandising, and  Fashion Institute of Technology.

Career 
Guadarrama established a fashion designing company Celestino Couture in 2005. Guadarrama designed Billy Porter's ensemble for the Tony Awards 2019. He was a participant in Project Runway season 18. He was among the top four who got the chance to present the collection at New York fashion week. His collection is mostly influenced by the political and environmental issues.

References 

1982 births
Living people
People from Austin, Texas
American fashion designers
LGBT fashion designers